Captain Cold (Leonard Snart) is a DC Comics supervillain.

Snart may also refer to:
 Golden Glider (Lisa Snart), Captain Cold's younger sister
 Lewis Snart, Captain Cold's father in the television series The Flash
 Roy Snart, actor in Bedknobs and Broomsticks

See also
 Smart (disambiguation)